Eucithara articulata is a small sea snail, a marine gastropod mollusk in the family Mangeliidae.

Description
The length of the shell attains 9 mm, its diameter 4 mm.

The shell has a subcylindrical-fusiform shape with an acuminate apex. It contains 7 convex whorls with spiral lirae and longitudinal ribs. The aperture is narrow and elongate. The fine lirae become whitish on crossing the ribs and give to the latter an articulated appearance. The colouring is rather faint and the markings not very clearly defined.

Distribution
This marine species occurs off the Philippines.

References

External links
  Tucker, J.K. 2004 Catalog of recent and fossil turrids (Mollusca: Gastropoda). Zootaxa 682:1-1295
  Petit, R. E. (2009). George Brettingham Sowerby, I, II & III: their conchological publications and molluscan taxa. Zootaxa. 2189: 1–218

articulata
Gastropods described in 1894